The Richmond Spiders baseball team represents the University of Richmond in National Collegiate Athletic Association (NCAA) Division I. The Spiders compete in the Atlantic 10 (A-10) conference. The Spiders play their home games at Malcolm U. Pitt Field, which is located on the main campus in Richmond, Virginia.  They are currently coached by head coach Tracy Woodson.

Coaching history

Richmond in the NCAA Tournament

Alumni in MLB
Andy Allanson - 1986–1989, 1991–1993, 1995
Mark Budzinski -  2003
Lew Burdette - 1950–1967
Sean Casey - 1997–2008
Vinny Capra - 2022-present
Lou Ciola - 1943
Herb Hash - 1940–1941
Bucky Jacobs - 1937, 1939–1940
Brian Jordan - 1992–2006
Joe Mahoney - 2012–2013
Renie Martin - 1979–1984
Tom Miller - 1918–1919
Vern Morgan - 1954–1955
Jack Sanford - 1940–1941, 1946
Mike Smith - 2002, 2006
Tim Stauffer - 2005–2007, 2009–2014
Porter Vaughan - 1940–1941, 1946

References

External links
 Spiders Baseball Website